Qarah Buteh (also Romanized as Qarah Būţeh and Qareh Būţeh) is a village in Chaypareh-ye Bala Rural District of Zanjanrud District of Zanjan County, Zanjan province, Iran. At the 2006 National Census, its population was 2,747 in 701 households. The following census in 2011 counted 2,691 people in 854 households. The latest census in 2016 showed a population of 2,594 people in 832 households; it was the largest village in its rural district.

References 

Zanjan County

Populated places in Zanjan Province

Populated places in Zanjan County